Bernard "Ben" C. Grandmaître , (born June 24, 1933) is a former politician from Ontario, Canada. He was a Liberal member of the Legislative Assembly of Ontario from 1984 to 1999 who represented the riding of Ottawa East. He served as a cabinet minister in the government of David Peterson.

Background
Grandmaître was born in Eastview, Ontario, and educated at Ottawa schools. He owned a small business in Vanier, Ontario for thirteen years. He was named a life member of the Centre francophone de Vanier, and was active in the Knights of Columbus.

Politics
Grandmaître was an alderman on the Vanier city council from 1969 to 1974, and served as its mayor from 1974 to 1980 and from 1982 to 1984.

He ran for the Ontario legislature in the 1981 provincial election, but lost to Bob MacQuarrie in the riding of Carleton East (future NDP cabinet minister Evelyn Gigantes finished third).

In government
On December 13, 1984, he was elected in a by-election to succeed retiring MPP Albert Roy in the riding of Ottawa East.  This riding is one of the safest Liberal seats in the province, and Grandmaitre was returned without difficulty in the 1985 provincial election.

The Liberals formed a minority government after this election, and Grandmaître was appointed as Minister of Municipal Affairs and Minister responsible for Francophone Affairs.  In the latter capacity, he played a major role in passing the province's French Language Services Act in 1986.

The Liberals won a landslide majority in the 1987 election, and Grandmaître defeated his nearest opponent by almost 15,000 votes.  He appointed as Minister of Revenue on September 29, 1987, while retaining responsibility for Francophone Affairs.  He was dropped from cabinet on August 2, 1989.

Cabinet positions

In opposition
The Liberals were defeated by the NDP in the 1990 election, although Grandmaître again retained his seat without difficulty.  He was re-elected again in the 1995 election, and retired in 1999.  He endorsed Dalton McGuinty's bid to lead the Ontario Liberal Party in 1996.

Electoral record

Honours and awards
In 2013 he was made a member of the Order of Canada. His citation reads, "for fostering the vitality and growth of Ontario's francophone community." There is an arena named after him in Ottawa and a French Catholic school in the Riverside South neighbourhood of Ottawa that bears his name.

References

External links
 

1933 births
Franco-Ontarian people
Mayors of Eastview and Vanier
Members of the Executive Council of Ontario
Members of the Order of Canada
Living people
Ontario Liberal Party MPPs
People from the United Counties of Prescott and Russell